Alois Kříž (26 February 1911 – 26 March 1947) was a Czechoslovak journalist and Nazi collaborator. He was accused of collaboration and hanged in March 1947.

Biography 

Alois Kříž was born in the Ottensen district of Hamburg, (Germany) to Czech parents. After his father was conscripted into the Austro-Hungarian Army at the outbreak of World War I, Alois and his mother moved to Ledvice in Bohemia, where he completed primary school. Kříž then studied at a secondary school in Duchcov, and in 1929 he started studying law at Charles University in Prague; however, he never graduated.

In the aftermath of Nazi Germany's occupation of Czechoslovakia and the establishment of the Protectorate of Bohemia and Moravia in March 1939, Kříž embraced Nazism and started working as a journalist for the German occupiers. He was also a member of the fascist movement Vlajka, and a writer of antisemitic and pro-Nazi propaganda literature. In 1944, Kříž was made editor-in-chief of Czech radio by the occupying authorities.

At the beginning of the Prague uprising, Kříž was arrested by insurgents and after the end of World War II he was accused of collaboration with the Germans and subsequently sentenced to death by a people's court in Prague. He was hanged at Pankrác Prison in March 1947, together with fellow Nazi collaborators Rudolf Novák (of Arijský boj) and Antonín J. Kožíšek. Kříž's last words were: "Ať žije národ, ať zhyne bolševismus!" ("Long live the nation, may Bolshevism perish!")

Bibliography 

 Krev za novou Evropu (1940)
 Co víte o Židech? (1940)

References 

1911 births
1947 deaths
Czech anti-communists
Czech collaborators with Nazi Germany
Czech journalists
Czech propagandists
Executed Czechoslovak collaborators with Nazi Germany
Executed Czech people
Nazis executed by Czechoslovakia by hanging
Czech radio journalists
Czech radio presenters
Radio controversies
20th-century journalists
Charles University alumni